The Schrader valve (also called American valve) is a type of pneumatic tire valve used on virtually every motor vehicle in the world today. The Schrader company, for which it was named, was founded in 1844 by August Schrader. The original Schrader valve design was invented in 1891, and patented in the United States in 1893.

The Schrader valve consists of a valve stem into which a valve core is threaded. The valve core is a poppet valve assisted by a spring. A small rubber seal located on the core keeps the fluid from escaping through the threads. Using the appropriate tools, a faulty valve core can be immediately extracted from the valve stem and replaced with a new one.

Uses
The Schrader valve is used on virtually all automobile tires and motorcycle tires and most wider rimmed bicycle tires. In addition to tube and tubeless tires, Schrader valves of varying diameters are used on many refrigeration and air conditioning systems to allow servicing, including recharging with refrigerant; by plumbers conducting leak-down pressure tests on pipe installations; as a bleeding and test port on the fuel rail of some fuel injected engines; on bicycle air shock absorbers to allow adjustment of air pressure according to the rider's weight; for medical gas outlets within hospitals and some medical vehicles; and in the buoyancy compensator (BC) inflators of SCUBA systems where the ability to easily disconnect an air hose (even underwater) without the loss of tank air is critical. Schrader valves are also widely used in high-pressure hydraulic systems on aircraft.

Many domestic fire extinguishers use an internal valve identical to a Schrader valve, but with a lever on top to enable quick release of the pressurized content.
It is also the same thread specification used on the shutter button of some old Leica, Yashica and also  Nikon F and F2 cameras.

Valve 

A Schrader valve consists of an externally threaded hollow cylindrical metal tube, typically of nickel plated brass. In the center of the exterior end is a metal pin pointing along the axis of the valve stem; the pin's end is approximately flush with the end of the valve body.

All Schrader valves used on tires have threads and bodies of a single standard size at the exterior end, so caps and tools generally are universal for the valves on all common applications. The core of the valve can be removed or tightened with a tool.

Industrial Schrader valves are available in different diameters and valve core variants and are used in refrigeration, propane, and a variety of other uses.

With the advent of miniature electronics, Schrader valve stems with integrated transmitters for tire pressure monitoring systems (TPMS) became available.

Cap 
A valve cap on a Schrader valve prevents entry of contaminants that may interfere with the sealing surfaces and cause leakage.

Metal, and some hard plastic valve caps, have a rubber washer or O-ring inside, both to prevent the cap from loosening and falling off due to vibration. These caps also serve as a mechanical seal to prevent air from leaking from a faulty valve core. Simple caps without a seal do not reliably prevent leaks. Some metal caps are equipped with prongs to enable removing and replacing valve cores, thereby serving two functions: seal and emergency tool. 

In refrigeration and air conditioning applications, the valve cap is considered to be the primary seal, with the Schrader valve only being used for service access.

Schrader versus other valve types

There are three valves used on tires worldwide: Schrader valves, Presta valves, and Dunlop valves. Each goes by multiple names. Schrader valves are also known as American valves or car valves. Presta valves are also known as French valves, Sclaverand valves, and road bike valves. Dunlop valves are also known as German valves, English valves, Holland valves, Woods valves, flash valves, and alligator valves. 

Schrader valves are almost universal on car, truck, and motorcycle tires worldwide. Presta and Dunlop valves are mostly found on bicycle tubes. Both the Schrader and the Presta types are effective for sealing high pressures. Their chief differences are that Schrader valves are larger and have springs that close the valve except when the pin is depressed. Schrader valves are used in a wide variety of compressed gas and pressurized liquid applications such as small torch and grill cylinders, and air shocks. Schrader valves are also viewed as more complex (requiring two seals over one). They weigh 4–5g more than Presta valves.

Schrader and Dunlop valve stems are 8 mm in diameter, whereas Presta valve stems are 6 mm, allowing Prestas to be used on narrower, high-performance rims as on road racing bicycles. Another disadvantage of the Schrader is that debris may be introduced into its spring-loaded pin, impairing inflation, whereas the Presta valve relies only on air pressure and a small knurled nut to keep it shut.

Inflating a bicycle tire equipped with a Presta or Dunlop valve at an automobile filling station requires an adaptor, while a Schrader-valved tube does not. Inflating at home or on the road requires either 6mm air chuck for Presta and Dunlop valves, or an 8mm chuck for Schrader valves. Some chucks have dual orifices to inflate all three.

Dimensions 
 External 8V1 thread:  x 32 TPI ( pitch; tap size 8v1-32)
 Internal 5V1 thread:  x 36 TPI ( pitch; tap size 5v1-36)

See also
 Inner tube

References

External links 

 Schrader-Bridgeport International (North American English version)

Vehicle parts
Air valves
Tires
1891 introductions
American inventions

fr:Valve Schrader